Chef Nak (born Rotanak Ros in 1985 in Phnom Penh, Cambodia) is a Cambodian celebrity chef, culinary author and entrepreneur.

Biography 
Rotanak first started cooking at the age of 4 or 5 together with her older sister and with the help of their neighbours to take care of her siblings while their parents were at the hospital recovering from a traffic accident. Afterwards, Rotanak and her older sister continued cooking for their siblings as their parents worked long hours.

At the age of 19, Rotanak started working for the non-profit Cambodian Living Arts as the Program Coordinator, before becoming its head of finance at the age of 22. There she learned about the preservation of Cambodian performing arts and soon began applying the knowledge gained in the preservation of Cambodian cuisine as well.

In October 2018, Rotanak started offering luxury private home cooking classes and dining at her house in Phnom Penh. She hosts one diner group a day for three days a week, while her cooking classes have a capacity of up to 60 people. It was named one of "Asia’s 7 top emerging foodie travel destinations" by the South China Morning Post in 2020.

In 2019, after a successful Kickstarter campaign, Rotanak released "Nhum: Recipes from a Cambodian Kitchen", a collection of approximately 80 traditional Cambodian recipes from various parts of Cambodia, in both English and Khmer. The cookbook received Gourmand Awards in the "Woman chef book" and "Published in Asia" categories in 2020.

In 2019, Rotanak partnered with Brasserie Louis in Rosewood Phnom Penh to design a 12 dish signature menu for the restaurant. She has also helped curate the Cambodian menu for the restaurant Khmer Kitchen in Bangalore, India.

In April 2021, Chef Nak was featured on The New York Times as her cookbook was made available on Amazon. Later that year, Rotanak was named one of "10 Asian Chefs and Innovators Who Have Changed the Way We Eat" by the American magazine Taste of Home. In May 2022, Chef Nak Home Dining was named one of the "14 of the Best Dining Experiences Around the World" by the travel magazine Travel + Leisure.

She is currently working on her next book "The Forgotten Flavors of Royal Cambodian Home Cuisine" focused on forgotten royal Cambodian dishes and a TV show around it.

References

External links 
Chef Nak's official website
Chef Nak's Facebook page
Chef Nak's Instagram page
Chef Nak's YouTube channel
Rotanak Ros 'Chef Nak', Cambodian Chef, Culinary Author and Entrepreneur. 19 January 2022. Rising Giants
Self-Taught Chef Turned Cambodian Cuisine Ambassador. 30 November 2019. Voice of America

Cambodian chefs
Women chefs
Cambodian businesspeople
Cambodian women in business
Cambodian cookbook writers
Living people
1985 births